I viaggiatori della sera is a 1979 Italian/Spanish science fiction-drama film written and directed by Ugo Tognazzi. It is loosely based on a novel with the same name by Umberto Simonetta.

Cast 
Ugo Tognazzi: Orso
Ornella Vanoni: Nicki
Corinne Cléry: Ortensia 
Roberta Paladini: Anna Maria 
Pietro Brambilla: Francesco 
José Luis López Vázquez: Simoncini 
William Berger: Cochi Fontana 
Manuel de Blas: Bertani 
Deddi Savagnone:  Mila 
Leonardo Benvenuti: Zafferi
Sergio Antonica : clerk  Motorway service area

References

External links

1979 films
1970s Italian-language films
Italian science fiction drama films
1970s science fiction drama films
Films directed by Ugo Tognazzi
Spanish science fiction drama films
Films about old age
1979 drama films
1970s Italian films